is a run and gun arcade game developed by Saurus and published by SNK in 1997 for the Neo-Geo arcade and home platform. Gameplay involves taking command of one or three soldiers in an eight-way shooter. A second game in the series, Shock Troopers: 2nd Squad, followed up in 1998.

Gameplay 

At the beginning of each session, players choose whether to go through the game in one of two modes, "Lonely Wolf" or "Team Battle". In "Lonely Wolf", one character is controlled throughout the game, while "Team Battle" allows selecting a band of three soldiers through their missions, switching between them on-the-fly. Choosing to go it alone gives a higher starting life total, while proceeding as a team will give a wider variety of special weapons as well as a higher starting total (ten for each of the three characters instead of twenty for one).

At the beginning of the game, there is also a choice to travel through the Mountain, Jungle, or Valley route. Halfway through the game, a different route can optionally be chosen otherwise stay on the current path. Characters and paths chosen determine how much life bonus is received at the beginning of each level. Each stage is interspersed with boss battles (both in the middle and at the end of each stage). Until the very end, battling the enemy commander atop an aircraft.

Each character has their own virtues over other selections. Some might start with higher life totals, while others could move faster. Regardless of choice, the soldiers each possess a unique special weapon or "bomb", which varies in distance and range. Controls consist of an eight-way joystick and four buttons. Players move in eight directions with the joystick and fire, do evasive maneuvers, use their special weapon, and switch characters with the A, B, C, and D buttons, respectively.

Players must progress through seven levels, each ending in a boss fight. The weapons can be fired in all eight directions, but holding down the fire button allows strafing. Attacking within close range of an enemy will yield items, including point bonuses, weapon power-ups, and life. Enemy fire can be avoided with the dodge button. In "Team Battle" mode, the three selected soldiers can be cycled to utilize the traits and special weapons of each.

Plot
The Bloody Scorpions terrorist group have kidnapped a scientist George Diamond and his granddaughter Cecilia Diamond in order to gain the powerful drug, Alpha-301, which converts normal people into superhuman soldiers. A special team composed of eight soldiers from different countries must fight through their ranks in order to get to their leader and save the scientist's granddaughter and the world. (The sequel, Shock Troopers: 2nd Squad, has a completely unrelated story and different characters.)

Ports and re-releases 
Shock Troopers was included in SNK Arcade Classics Vol. 1, a video game compilation for PlayStation 2, PlayStation Portable and Wii.

SNK Playmore released ports for PlayStation 3 and PlayStation Portable developed by M2 on August 25, 2011 on PlayStation Network via NEOGEO Station.

D4 Enterprise developed and published a port for the Virtual Console for Wii, which was released in Japan on May 22, 2012; in North America on October 25, 2012; and in Europe on November 8, 2012.

A port developed by DotEmu for Microsoft Windows, OS X, Linux and asm.js was released by SNK Playmore as part of the Humble NEOGEO 25th Anniversary Bundle on December 8, 2015. It was released on Steam on May 18, 2016 and on GOG.com on May 30, 2017.

Reception
In Japan, Game Machine listed Shock Troopers on their December 15, 1998 issue as being the thirteenth most-successful arcade game of the month.

The game was very well received. Classic Game Room described Shock Troopers for the PlayStation 3 as an "amazing" shooter with "fantastic" gameplay, controls, and the best game of 2011, despite being just a re-release. Nintendo Life's Corbie Dillard scored the Virtual Console release a 7/10 and opined it "succeeds in offering up an intense and explosive run-and-gun experience." Digitally Downloaded reviewer awarded it four-and-half stars out of five, stating: "If you’ve never played a run-n’-gun shooter before, Shock Troopers should be one of your top contenders, regardless of your skill level." According to Hardcore Gaming 101, unlike the version included in SNK Arcade Classics Vol. 1, the VC version "runs almost perfectly." The website especially hailed the game's "fantastic presentation that ranks among the best in the genre."

Notes

References

External links 
 Shock Troopers at GameFAQs
 Shock Troopers at Giant Bomb
 Shock Troopers at Killer List of Videogames
 Shock Troopers at MobyGames

1997 video games
ACA Neo Geo games
Arcade video games
Cooperative video games
D4 Enterprise games
Linux games
MacOS games
Multiplayer and single-player video games
Neo Geo games
Nintendo Switch games
PlayStation Network games
PlayStation 4 games
Run and gun games
Saurus games
SNK franchises
SNK Playmore games
Video games about terrorism
Video games developed in Japan
Video games featuring female protagonists
Video games scored by Masahiko Hataya
Video games scored by Masaki Kase
Virtual Console games
Windows games
Xbox One games
Hamster Corporation games